Penstemon caesius is a species of penstemon known by the common name San Bernardino beardtongue. It is endemic to California, where it is known from the San Bernardino and San Gabriel Mountains, as well as the southern mountains of the Sierra Nevada. It is a member of the flora on rocky slopes and in coniferous forests and alpine habitat in the mountains. It is a perennial herb with erect branches up to about 80 centimeters in maximum height. The lower branches may be woody, the upper hairless and waxy, and the inflorescence glandular. Most of the leaves are basal on the plant, rounded or oval, and up to about 4 centimeters long. The inflorescence produces purple-blue tubular flowers roughly 2 centimeters long. The flower has a glandular outer surface, a coat of hairs inside, and a hairless staminode. The flowers of this penstemon are pollinated by bees of genus Osmia, which feed on their nectar.

References

External links

caesius
Endemic flora of California
Flora without expected TNC conservation status